M. K. Muthukaruppannasamy is an Indian politician and was a member of the Tamil Nadu Legislative Assembly from the Pollachi constituency from 2011-2016. He represented the Anna Dravida Munnetra Kazhagam party.

References 

Members of the Tamil Nadu Legislative Assembly
All India Anna Dravida Munnetra Kazhagam politicians
Living people
Year of birth missing (living people)